Oxymorphone-3-methoxynaltrexonazine (OM-3-MNZ) is a morphinan-based opioid that acts as a selective μ-opioid receptor agonist, unlike the closely related mixed agonist-antagonist Oxymorphonenaltrexonazine.

See also 
 Naloxonazine
 Naloxone
 Naltrexone
 Oxymorphone

References 

Cyclopropanes
4,5-Epoxymorphinans
Opioids
Phenol ethers